Room in Rome is a 2010 Spanish erotic romantic comedy-drama film directed by Julio Medem starring Elena Anaya and Natasha Yarovenko, depicting the emotional and sexual relations of two women throughout a single night in a hotel room in Rome. The plot is loosely based on another film, In Bed. Room in Rome was Medem's first English language film.

Plot
During the first day of the summer in June, Alba, a 30-year-old Spanish tourist in Rome, brings a younger Russian woman Natasha to her hotel room during the last night of both their vacations in Rome. The details of how they met in a nightclub are left vague. Once in the room, Natasha is at first quite reluctant, insisting she's straight, but the clearly more experienced Alba deftly overcomes Natasha's hesitance. Flattered and tempted by Alba, Natasha responds to her sexual advances, but continues to maintain that she is straight and has never had sex with a woman. Alba counters by claiming that she is a lesbian and has never had sex with a man.

Alba and Natasha first get undressed and into bed, but Natasha is still very nervous. Alba suggests that they first lay side by side and only casually touch each other's faces. They do so until Alba becomes so relaxed that she falls asleep. Natasha quietly gets out of bed, gets dressed and leaves the room, wondering what would have happened if she stayed and consummated her curiosity and attraction to Alba. In her rush to leave, Natasha leaves her cell phone behind, and the ring-tone wakes up Alba. Natasha soon returns and asks Alba for her cell phone, but is reluctant to enter the room again. When a passing night-shift waiter named Max passes by, Alba grabs Natasha and takes her back into the room. While talking about the location of Natasha's hotel and looking at an old map of Rome from the 1st century, Alba continues to flirt with Natasha with her naked body. Natasha soon succumbs to her attraction and curiosity towards Alba, leading her to quickly get undressed once again and into bed where she and Alba have sex for the first time.

Over the next 10 hours, Alba and Natasha grow closer to each other as Natasha becomes more relaxed and comfortable around Alba with their lovemaking. Alba and Natasha share stories, periodically stopping to illustrate their points with pictures on the Internet, talk about the artwork in the hotel room, and explore each other's nude bodies through sex. Alba first tells a story about how her mother abandoned her when she was a little girl and she ended up as the kept woman of a wealthy Arab in Saudi Arabia, while Natasha later shares a story of her abusive father and her twin sister's career as an art historian.

Eventually, the two women tell each other the truth. Natasha reveals that her real name is Dasha who comes from a wealthy family living near Moscow and that she is actually a professional tennis player on vacation, and is to be married the following week in Russia to a man. Natasha's twin sister, Sasha, a model and career actress, phones her at least twice during the film to ask of her whereabouts and wedding plans. Alba then reveals that she is actually a mechanical engineer/inventor in Rome on business and she lives with a woman in San Sebastian, Spain. Alba shows Natasha a video of herself and her life partner, named Edurne, who have two small children, a little boy and girl, and who are of Basque origin. Alba also says that the little boy died recently in a drowning accident. She says the story she'd related earlier is that of her mother, who left her Saudi father to break free.

Natasha and Alba have breakfast together at dawn, which is served by the cheerful room service waiter, Max. They discuss abandoning their partners and living together in Rome, but both seem to realize that this is not possible. While Alba tells Natasha that she feels she is falling in love with her, Natasha gets more defensive and insists that her attraction to Alba only stems from curiosity towards the same sex, but not through love. After having sex a final time and then hanging the white bed sheet up a flagpole on the balcony of the room as a gag, the two one-time lovers eventually decide to part ways, returning to their previous lives in Russia and Spain. They both agree to let the passionate night they shared remain a secret between them. In the final shot, after leaving the hotel and walking away from each other, Natasha calls out to Alba and runs towards her.

Cast

Production
The film was produced by Morena Films production alongside Alicia Produce, and it had the participation of TVE and Canal+. It was shot almost entirely on a sound stage in Madrid, Spain as the hotel room setup. The location of the hotel in the film is an empty square called Piazzetta di San Simeone, the same square used in opening and closing shots of the film.

Principal photography took place in Rome and Madrid from 26 January to 27 February 2009.

Release 
Selected to have its world premiere as the 13th Málaga Film Festival's closing film, Room in Rome premiered in April 2010. Distributed by Paramount Spain, it was theatrically released in Spain on 7 May 2010.

Reception
Jonathan Holland of Variety described the film as a "typically challenging, potentially divisive item from Spanish auteur Julio Medem, and a partial return to form", but despite praising the acting and craft of the film Holland writes "there’s the sense that he’s more interested in his ideas than in his people."

See also 
 List of Spanish films of 2010

References

Bibliography

External links
 
 
 AfterEllen.com review

2010s erotic drama films
2010s English-language films
English-language Spanish films
Spanish LGBT-related films
Spanish independent films
Lesbian-related films
Films directed by Julio Medem
Films scored by Jocelyn Pook
2010 LGBT-related films
2010 films
LGBT-related drama films
Spanish erotic drama films
Films set in Rome
Basque-language films
Film remakes 
Erotic romance films
2010 drama films
2010 multilingual films
Spanish multilingual films
2010s Spanish films